Everything Waits to be Noticed is the ninth post-Simon & Garfunkel studio album by Art Garfunkel, a collaboration with singer-songwriters Maia Sharp and Buddy Mondlock. Credited to "Art Garfunkel With Maia Sharp & Buddy Mondlock", the album is Garfunkel's debut as a songwriter, co-writing six songs, and was produced by Billy Mann. It is his first release on Blue Note Records after years of recording for Columbia Records. The album failed to chart.

Track listing
"Bounce" (Graham Lyle, Billy Mann) – 3:33
"The Thread" (Art Garfunkel, Buddy Mondlock, Maia Sharp) – 4:18
"The Kid" (Mondlock) – 4:27
"Crossing Lines" (Gary Burr, Dan Haseltine, Sharp) – 3:37
"Everything Waits to Be Noticed" (Garfunkel, Mondlock, Sharp) – 3:12
"Young and Free" (Richard Julian) – 3:41
"Perfect Moment" (Garfunkel, Mondlock, Pierce Pettis) – 3:59
"Turn, Don't Turn Away" (Garfunkel, Mann, Mondlock) – 5:02
"Wishbone" (Garfunkel, Mann, Mondlock) – 3:35
"How Did You Know?" (Garfunkel, Mann, Sharp) – 4:24
"What I Love About Rain" (Lisa Aschmann, Tom Kimmel) – 3:35
"Every Now and Then" (Garth Brooks, Mondlock) – 3:18
"Another Only One" (Sharp, Christopher Faizi) – 4:16
"Perfect Moment" (Acoustic Version, Japan only)  – 3:57

Personnel
 Art Garfunkel – lead vocals
 Buddy Mondlock – lead vocals
 Maia Sharp – lead vocals
 Tony Harrell – accordion (tracks 3, 6)
 Buddy Mondlock – acoustic guitar (tracks 2, 3, 5, 7, 11, 12)
 Billy Mann – backing vocals (track 9), acoustic guitar (tracks 1, 8, 9, 13)
 Mark Hill – bass guitar (tracks 1 to 4, 6 to 13)
 Shannon Forrest – drums (tracks 1, 7 to 10), percussion (track 10)
 Steve Brewster – drums (tracks 3, 4, 6, 11, 13)
 George Marinelli – electric guitar (tracks 1, 7 to 10, 11)
 Tony Harrell – keyboards (tracks 1 to 4, 6 to 13)
 Jeff King – mandolin (track 4), electric guitar (tracks 2 to 4, 6, 13)
 Larry Beaird – mandolin (tracks 9, 11), electric guitar (track 7), banjo (track 6), acoustic guitar (tracks 1, 3, 4, 6 to 9, 11 to 13)
 Eric Darken – percussion (tracks 2, 3, 4, 6, 11, 12), 
 Maia Sharp – soprano saxophone (tracks 2, 7 to 9, 11), clarinet (track 3)
 James Grosjean – viola (tracks 5, 13), 
 Kristin Wilkinson – viola (tracks 5, 13)
 Alan Umstead – violin (track 13)
 Carl Gorodetzky – violin (tracks 5, 13)
 Conni Ellisor – violin (track 13)
 Lee Larrison – violin (track 13)
 Pamela Sixfin – violin (tracks 5, 13)
 Robert Mason – cello (tracks 3, 5, 13)
 Carole A. Rabinowitz – cello (track 13)

References

2002 albums
Art Garfunkel albums
Blue Note Records albums